Dong Dam is a village and tambon (subdistrict) of Li District, in Lamphun Province, Thailand. In 2005 it had a population of 3128 people. The tambon contains six villages.

References

Tambon of Lamphun province
Populated places in Lamphun province